Johannes Nicolaas Leddy (12 January 1930 – 25 December 2022) was a Dutch television and film actor. He was most known for his roles as Jan Engelmoer in the television series De kleine waarheid and as Koos Dobbelsteen in Zeg 'ns Aaa.

Leddy died at the Jeroen Bosch Hospital in 's-Hertogenbosch, on 25 December 2022, at the age of 92.

References

1930 births
2022 deaths
20th-century Dutch male actors
Dutch male film actors
Dutch male television actors
Male actors from The Hague